The MTV Video Music Award for Album of the Year is a recent award given at the annual MTV Video Music Awards. It was first introduced at the 2022 MTV Video Music Awards, making this the first time that the ceremony has recognized albums in the award-giving categories. Harry Styles was the first winner of the category with Harry's House.

Recipients

References 

MTV Video Music Awards
Album awards